Lachabad may refer to:
Lachabad, Faryab (لاچ اباد - Lāchābād)
Lachabad, Rudbar-e Jonubi (لچ اباد - Lachābād)